Zeros is the second full-length studio album by American post-punk band the Soft Moon. It was released on October 30, 2012 by Captured Tracks. The album was composed entirely by frontman Luis Vasquez. Production and mixing duties were completed by Monte Vallier at Ruminator Audio. The theme of the record has been described as post-apocalyptic. Comparing the record to previous releases, Vasquez told Fact Magazine, "My approach for Zeros was to be more conceptual, thematic, and visual." As of 2017, the album holds a score of 72 on the aggregate review site Metacritic, indicating "generally favorable reviews" by music critics.

Track listing

Personnel
 Josh Bonati – mastering at Bonati Mastering, Brooklyn, NY
 Luis Vasquez – keyboards, guitar, bass, composition, songwriting
 Monte Vallier – production, mixing, additional and replacement recordings

References

2012 albums
Captured Tracks albums
The Soft Moon albums